Halbert Owen Woodward (April 8, 1918 – October 2, 2000) was a United States district judge of the United States District Court for the Northern District of Texas.

Education and career

Born in Coleman, Texas, Woodward received a Bachelor of Business Administration degree from the University of Texas at Austin in 1940 and a Bachelor of Laws from the University of Texas School of Law in 1940. He was a hearing examiner for the Texas Employment Commission from 1940 to 1941. He was a title examiner for the Humble Oil and Refining Company from 1941 to 1942. He was in the United States Navy as a Lieutenant during World War II, from 1942 to 1945. He was a land and title supervisor for the Humble Oil and Refining Company from 1945 to 1949. He was in private practice in Coleman from 1949 to 1968. He was a member of the Highway Commission of the State of Texas from 1959 to 1968, and Chairman from 1967 to 1968.

Federal judicial service

Woodward was nominated by President Lyndon B. Johnson on April 25, 1968, to a seat on the United States District Court for the Northern District of Texas vacated by Judge Joseph Brannon Dooley. He was confirmed by the United States Senate on June 6, 1968, and received his commission on June 7, 1968. He served as Chief Judge from 1977 to 1986. He assumed senior status on December 30, 1986. Woodward served in that capacity until his death on October 2, 2000 in Brownwood, Texas.

References

Sources
 

1918 births
2000 deaths
People from Coleman, Texas
McCombs School of Business alumni
University of Texas School of Law alumni
Judges of the United States District Court for the Northern District of Texas
United States district court judges appointed by Lyndon B. Johnson
20th-century American judges
United States Navy officers
Military personnel from Texas
20th-century American lawyers